Kentuck may refer to:
Kentuck, Alabama
Kentuck, Virginia
Kentuck, West Virginia

See also
Kentucky